Sexion d'Assaut (French pronunciation: [sɛksjɔ̃ daso]), formerly known as 3ème Prototype (for "Troisième Prototype" [tʁwɑzjɛm pʁɔtɔtip]; English: "3rd Prototype"), was a French hip hop band formed in 2002, composed of eight Parisian rappers. They are signed to independent record label Wati B, which is under exclusive license to Sony Music Entertainment France.

The founding members were L.I.O. Pétrodollars, Alpha Diallo, Maska and Lefa. In 2003, it became a collective as Maître Gims and JR joined in. Throughout its existence, it included about 69 rappers, but set-up changed from time to time. The group distinguishes itself of staying away from "bling bling" that other French rappers have adopted. They also retain the style of old school hip-hop, but keep underground influences and spent almost a decade fostering an underground fanbase before releasing their debut studio album L'école des points vitaux in 2010.

Their album L'École des points vitaux in 2010 went quadruple platinum. The album En attendant L'Apogée: les Chroniques du 75 in 2011 and L'Apogée in 2012 both went platinum and diamond respectively.

Albums

Studio albums

Compilation albums

Mixtapes and Street albums

Live albums

EPs

Singles

Featured in

Other releases and charted songs

Clips 

 2007: "Histoire pire que vraie"
 2008: "Anti-Tecktonik"
 2009: "T'es bête ou quoi?"
 2009: "Wati-Bon Son" (feat. Dry)
 2010: "L'école des points vitaux"
 2010: "Casquette à l'envers"
 2010: "Changement d'ambiance"
 2010: "Désolé"
 2010: "Wati by Night" (feat. Dry)
 2011: "Ca marche en équipe" (feat. H Magnum)
 2011: "Paris va bien"
 2011: "Qui t'a dit?"
 2011: "Plus qu'un son"
 2011: "Vu la haine que j'ai"
 2011: "Pas d'chance"
 2011: "Noir"
 2011: "Traqué"
 2011: "À bout d'souffle"
 2011: "O'brothers"
 2011: "Flow d'killer"
 2012: "Disque d'or"
 2012: "Excellent" (feat. H Magnum)
 2012: "Avant qu'elle parte"
 2012: "Ma direction"
 2012: "Wati House"

Street Clips 

 2008: "30%"
 2008: "Chroniques du Mystère"
 2008: "Où sont les Kickeurs?"
 2008: "Freestyle
 2009: "Ah ouais parait que j'suis doué"
 2009: "Même pas l'smic"
 2010: "Le Relais"
 2010: "A.D. (Africain Déterminé)"
 2010: "Instinct de Survie"
 2010: "Cramponnez-vous"
 2011: "Ra-Fall"
 2011: "BSS"
 2011: "Vu la haine que j'ai"
 2011: "Pas d'Chance"
 2011: "Black Shady part. 2"
 2011: "Mamadou"
 2011: "Boy's in the Hood"
 2011: "H.L.M. Life"

References 

Discographies of French artists
Hip hop discographies